Bani Seri is a village in Kotli Sattian Tehsil, Rawalpindi District, Punjab, Pakistan, in the Karore Valley. This village is in the area of Union Council Aryari. 

Populated places in Rawalpindi District